Qaleh-ye Tarvan (also Romanized as Qal‘eh-ye Tarvān; also known as Qal‘eh-ye Tanrān, Qal‘eh-ye Tarān, and Tārvān) is a village in Damen Rural District, in the Central District of Iranshahr County, Sistan and Baluchestan Province, Iran. At the 2006 census, its population was 1,018, in 189 families.

References 

Populated places in Iranshahr County